Azygophleps boisduvalii is a moth in the  family Cossidae. It is found in most of Africa (including Guinea, Sierra Leone, Ghana, Cameroon, Nigeria, Sudan, Ethiopia, Kenya, Uganda, the Democratic Republic of the Congo, Zambia, Zimbabwe, Senegal, Malawi and Côte d’Ivoire).

References

Moths described in 1854
Azygophleps
Moths of Africa